, better known as , is a Japanese enka singer. She made her debut in 1970, but only began to be recognised in 1985, after changing record company, releasing her hit single (道頓堀人情), which went on to sell over half a million copies.

She made her first NHK Red and White Song Festival performance in 1993, but was not selected to perform again until 1996, the year she released her biggest hit (珍島物語) and won the best singing award, establishing herself as one of the best female enka singer. And from 1996 onwards, Yoshimi has performed for 21 years consecutively in the prestigious year-end show.

Discography

Singles

Albums

Filmography

Advertisements

TV series

NHK Kōhaku Uta Gassen

References

External links
 
 

Japanese women singers
1954 births
Living people
People from Tanabe, Wakayama
Musicians from Wakayama Prefecture